California's 6th congressional district is a congressional district in the U.S. state of California. It is represented by Democrat Ami Bera.

Currently, the 6th district is entirely in Sacramento County and includes the north side of the city of Sacramento and its suburbs of Rancho Cordova, Citrus Heights, Rio Linda, Elverta, Arden-Arcade, Antelope, Foothill Farms, North Highlands, and most of Fair Oaks.

Prior to redistricting by the California Citizens Redistricting Commission of 2021, the district included the entire city of Sacramento and some of its suburbs. The district was represented by Democrat Doris Matsui.

Election results from recent statewide races

Composition

Sacramento County is split between this district and both the 3rd district and 7th district. The 6th and 3rd districts are partitioned by Latrobe Rd, Scott Rd, Deer Creek, Carson Creek, Nimbus Rd, E3 Highway, Illinois Ave, Madison Ave, Kenneth Ave, Wachtel Way, and Old Auburn Rd. The 6th and 7th districts are partitioned by the Sacramento River, American River, Fair Oaks Blvd, Watt Ave, Kiefer Blvd, Highway 16, Bradshaw Rd, Highway E2, and Stonehouse Dr. The 6th district takes in the north side of the city of Sacramento, the cities of Citrus Heights and Rancho Cordova, and the census-designated places Antelope, Arden-Arcade, Carmichael, Fair Oaks, Foothill Farms, North Highlands, La Riviera, and Rio Linda.

Cities & CDP with 10,000 or more people
 Sacramento - 524,943
 Arden-Arcade - 94,659
 Citrus Heights - 87,583
 Carmichael - 79,793
 Rancho Cordova - 75,087
 North Highlands - 42,694
 Foothill Farms - 33,121
 Fair Oaks - 32,514
 Rio Linda - 16,115

List of members representing the district

Election results for members

1884

1886

1888

1890

1892

1894

1896

1898

1900

1902

1904

1906

1908

1910

1912

1914

1916

1918

1920

1922 (Special)

1922

1924

1926

1928

1930

1932

1934

1936

1938

1940

1942

1944

1946

1948

1950

1952

1954

1956

1958

1960

1962

1964

1966

1968

1970

1972

1974 (Special)

1974

1976

1978

1980

1982

1984

1986

1988

1990

1992

1994

1996

1998

2000

2002

2004

2006

2008

2010

2012

2014

2016

2018

2020

See also
 List of United States congressional districts

References

External links
 GovTrack.us: California's 6th congressional district
 RAND California Election Returns: District Definitions (out of date)
 California Voter Foundation map - CD06 (out of date)

06
Government of Sacramento County, California
Government of Yolo County, California
Sacramento, California
West Sacramento, California
Constituencies established in 1885
1885 establishments in California